is a Japanese science fiction anime television series produced by Sunrise, a spiritual successor to the 2013 anime Gundam Build Fighters, based on the long-running Gundam franchise. It is directed by Shinya Watada (Gundam Build Fighters Try) and written by Noboru Kimura (SoltyRei, Dragonar Academy) with character designs by Juri Toida. It was first teased in December 2017 under the title "Gundam Build Next Battle Project" until its official reveal in The Gundam Base Tokyo on February 2, 2018. It premiered on all TXN network stations in Japan on April 3, 2018. Unlike the previous series, which focuses on the Gundam model (Gunpla) aspect of the franchise, Gundam Build Divers focuses on a virtual reality massively multiplayer online game in terms of themes and battles.

A sequel series, Gundam Build Divers Re:Rise, was announced on November 21, 2018, and was released in October 2019 as part of the 40th-anniversary celebration of the Gundam franchise.  Shinya Watada is returning to direct the series at Sunrise Beyond, with Yasuyuki Muto as scriptwriter, Shuri Toida as character designer, and Hideakira Kimura as music composer.

A prologue original net animation was aired by Sunrise on February 2, 2018, while two sidestories began serialization in June 2018 on both Gundam Ace and Dengeki Hobby Magazine respectively.

Plot
In the near future, where the Gundam franchise is at its peak and the popularity of Gunpla is soaring to new heights, a new virtual reality massively multiplayer online game (VRMMO) game called Gunpla Battle Nexus Online (GBN) is made. In Gunpla Battle Nexus Online, players can upload themselves and their Gunpla online through the virtual space and battle with players from across the world. In the game itself, the player assumes the role of a Gunpla Diver, and each year a special tournament called "Gunpla Force Battle Tournament" is held to prove who is the best Gunpla Diver. The story revolves around Riku Mikami, a 14-year old junior high school student and an admirer of famous Gunpla Diver Kyoya Kujo. He and his friends Yukio and Momoka love Gunpla and play GBN together. However, his own life changes as he meets a mysterious female Diver named Sarah as strange events take place in the GBN with the appearance of Mass-Divers. Now guided by his new allies, he forms their first Gunpla Diver group, embarking on epic adventures with his friends and to see who is the best fighter in the GBN world which would soon bring unforeseen forces to gunpla.

Characters

Build Divers
 / 
 (Japanese), Erik Scott Kimerer (English)
Leader of the Force , he is a 14-year-old middle school student who looks to follow in the footsteps of his idol, Gunpla Battle champion Kyoya Kujo, however he didn't know he ended up following similar footsteps to one of the champion's force's best members. Riku's Gunpla is the GN-0000DVR Gundam 00 Diver, later upgraded to the GN-0000DVR/A Gundam 00 Diver Ace. After the Diver Ace is destroyed in a battle with Tsukasa, Riku rebuilds it from scratch into the GN-0000DVR/S Gundam 00 Sky.
 / 

Riku's classmate and best friend. He is a fan of Gundam and has extensive knowledge of the franchise. His Gunpla is the RGM-86RBM GM III Beam Master and later, the RGM-89BM Jegan Blast Master.
 / 

Riku and Yukio's classmate and a member of the girls' soccer club. She tries to drag Riku and Yukio to the soccer club at first, but ends up getting interested in GBN instead. After piloting a rented Kapool during the first time she logged into GBN, she was inspired by it to create her own Gunpla, the PEN-01M Momokapool.

A mysterious girl Riku and Yukki meet on their first day in GBN. Despite being part of the Build Divers, she has no Gunpla and usually rides with Riku. She was revealed by the AI system to be an "EL-Diver", an electronic lifeform created by the Gunpla's feelings and emotions through GBN's cyberspace.  The proof was made when the AI system discovered she has no human identity. Her mind and data are later transferred to a real Gunpla, the HER-SELF Mobile Doll Sarah, which is capable of interacting with others and roams around in the real world as well as logging in as a regular GBN user.  Later on it is revealed that she is NOT the first EL-Diver to exist nor the only one, especially not an only child and her appearance's colors embodied a legacy.
 / 

A veteran Gunpla builder who builds rental units for The Gundam Base Tokyo. Formerly nicknamed , Koichi was ranked third in the Japanese Gunpla Championship and eighth in the World Tournament, but when Gunpla Battle evolved from the physical-based GP Duel (GPD) to GBN, his Gunpla team quit the hobby, leaving him in a state of depression for four years. When Koichi sees Riku and his friends rebuilding all of his old Gunpla, he agrees to join the Build Divers, piloting the RMS-117G11 Galbaldy Rebake. At the same time, he gets a job at The Gundam Base Tokyo. 
 / 

A high schooler and a female diver dressed as a kunoichi, she is tasked by Tsukasa to keep an eye on Riku and his friends, but eventually grows fond of them, becoming part of the team for good. She pilots the RX-零 RX-Zeromaru, an SD Gunpla that is accompanied by a remote-controlled armored eagle, the Armed Armor Hattori. Both can combine into the stronger "Real Mode". In the battle against Avalon and the Second Coalition of Volunteers, she upgraded her Gunpla into the RX-零/覚醒 RX-Zeromaru (Shinki Kessho). 
 / 

An employee of The Gundam Base Tokyo who is Koichi's younger sister and a friend of Riku and Yukki. She also grows tomatoes on the mall's roof garden and later joins the Build Divers in GBN as a support member.

GBN Users
 / 

His Gunpla is the AGE-IIMG Gundam AGEII Magnum. In the real world, his hair color is brown.

Leader of the ,the second highest-ranked Gunpla Diver, GBN's top strategist, and Kyoya's arch-rival. Despite their rivalry they are still very good friends. His avatar in the GBN world has the form of an ermine. His Gunpla is the GH-001RB Grimoire Red Beret.

A flamboyant Diver and leader of  who becomes Riku and Yukki's navigator and mentor in GBN. Magee is 23rd overall in the GBN world ranking. His Gunpla is the ZGMF-X20A-LP Gundam Love Phantom.  He tends to talk in an exaggerated effeminate fashion called "Onee-kotoba" (older-sister-speech), even in the real world.

Ogre's younger brother who bullies rookie Divers for their points in GBN. On Riku and Yukki's first day Do-ji tricks them into exiting the training stage into Free Battle Mode so he can destroy their Gunpla, but despite damaging Yukki's GM III Beam Master, he loses to Riku's Gundam 00 Diver. His Gunpla is the xvt-mmc Geara Ghirarga. He later apologizes to all Build Diver members because of his shameful actions, including bullying rookie Divers and the usage of the Break Decal. He was later mentioned by Yukki, wanting to introduce himself in the real world but was busy on other matters.

His Gunpla is the GNX-803OG Ogre GN-X and later, the RX-78GP02R Gundam GP-Rase-Two.
 / 

Tigerwolf trains Riku and Yukki in honing their skills as Divers. His Gunpla is the  XXXG-01S2龍虎狼 Gundam Jiyan Altron. After hearing Sarah is an electronic lifeform, he became a freelance diver and teamed up with the Build Divers. His human identity is similar to that of a fitness trainer.
 / 

Shahryar is very passionate about Gunpla, struggling to find love within a kit's construction, build quality, and presentation. His Gunpla is the GN-1001N Seravee Gundam Scheherazade. His human identity is of a wealthy foreigner, much to everyone's shock, except Magee.

A member of Force Hyakki. A female Diver who pilots the Jagd Doga Thorn, her strength has been recognized by Ogre himself.

Other characters

Once a member of Koichi's GPD club, he loathes GBN not only because it replaces GPD, but according to him, GBN does not have the thrills of a true battle, with players fighting at the risk of getting their Gunpla damaged or even destroyed. Thus he started distributing the "Break Decals", illegal programs that boost a Gunpla's capabilities, but creates several bugs in the GBN system, with the intention of destroying it. He later joins forces with Koichi in his plan to make use of a Break Decal to save Sarah without running the risk of breaking GBN, known as a Build Decal. His Gunpla is the MBF-PNN Gundam Astray No-Name. Despite successfully saving Sarah, he is still avoiding loose ends away from Kyoya, Magee, Kotaro and Ruck Arge because of his past actions.

 / 

The administrator of the GBN who oversees its functioning. His avatar is based on a SD Gundam Force character Gundiver.

The developer and creator of the GBN. Her avatar is based on the Crystal Phoenix from SD Sengokuden Densetsu no Daishogun.

Production
The series was first teased after the airing of the 5th episode of Gundam Build Fighters: Battlogue in December 2017, with the working title "Gundam Build Next Battle Project" On the official press conference held in The Gundam Base Tokyo in Japan reveals the series after the prologue ONA is streamed. Though Gunpla battles is the main aspect of the series, virtual reality and massively multiplayer online game games with will be part of series's theme in terms of the series's storyline and also the theme surrounding Gunpla Battle Nexus Online. Alongside the reveal, several character designs were revealed for both the prologue ONA and the anime as well as the main mechas of the series. Staff members from Gundam Build Fighters also returned to produce the anime, with some of the mecha are designed by Kunio Okawara, Kanetake Ebikawa, Junya Ishigaki, Ippei Gyobu, Kenji Teraoka, Shinya Terashima, Takayuki Yanase, and Naohiro Washio. Mecha battles in the series are directed by Masami Obari alongside animators Shinya Kusumegi and Sakiko Uda.

Media

Anime
The anime premiered on all TXN network stations in Japan on April 3, 2018, replacing Idol Time PriPara on its initial timeslot. The series' music is composed by Hideakira Kimura. A prologue ONA titled Gundam Build Divers Prologue was first streamed at The Gundam Base Tokyo on February 2, 2018, and later released on YouTube on the same date. The series is also streamed at Sunrise's "GundamInfo" channel on YouTube with subtitles in English, among other languages. In 2018, Sunrise had Bang Zoom Entertainment to produce an English dub for the series. The series was later streamed on Funimation's FunimationNow streaming service in North America on March 28, 2019.

A sequel, titled Gundam Build Divers Re:Rise premiered in October 2019 on Sunrise's new "Gundam Channel" on YouTube.  Most of the staff members returned to reprise their roles.

Manga
A sidestory Manga titled  began serialization in Kadokawa Shoten's monthly Gundam Ace Magazine in June 2018 to October 2019. The Manga was illustrated by Shiitake Gensui (Go to Helln) and written by Ryōji Sekinishi with mecha designs from Takayuki Yanase.

Video games
One of the series's Mobile Suits, Gundam AGE II Magnum appeared in the  2018 PlayStation 4 game New Gundam Breaker.

Merchandise
Part of the series's merchandise was released under Bandai's long running Gunpla line of scale models and sub-collectible line such as Robot Spirits figures.

References

External links
 
 (TV Tokyo) 

2018 anime television series debuts
Television series about artificial intelligence
Gundam anime and manga
Metafictional television series
Shōnen manga
Sunrise (company)
TV Tokyo original programming
Virtual reality in fiction